Joseph Andrew Readman (20 November 1901 – 1973) was an English footballer who played for Bournemouth & Boscombe Athletic, Brighton & Hove Albion, Millwall and Mansfield Town.

References

1901 births
1973 deaths
English footballers
Association football forwards
English Football League players
Bolton Wanderers F.C. players
AFC Bournemouth players
Brighton & Hove Albion F.C. players
Millwall F.C. players
Mansfield Town F.C. players